A mineraloid is a naturally occurring mineral-like substance that does not demonstrate crystallinity. Mineraloids possess chemical compositions that vary beyond the generally accepted ranges for specific minerals. For example, obsidian is an amorphous glass and not a crystal. Jet is derived from decaying wood under extreme pressure. Opal is another mineraloid because of its non-crystalline nature. Pearl is considered a mineraloid because the included calcite and/or aragonite crystals are bonded by an organic material, and there is no definite proportion of the components.

Examples

 Allophane, solid (IMA/CNMNC valid mineral name)
 Amber, non-crystalline structure, organic
 Anthracite or hard coal
 Bituminous coal
 Chlorophaeite
 Chrysocolla, solid (IMA/CNMNC valid mineral name)
 Deweylite, a mixture of serpentine and talc or stevensite
 Diatomite
 Ebonite, vulcanized natural or synthetic rubber (organic); lacks a crystalline structure
 Fulgurite, a variety of the mineraloid lechatelierite
 Jet, non-crystalline nature, organic (very compact coal)
 Lechatelierite, nearly pure silica glass, solid (IMA/CNMNC valid mineral name)
 Leonardite
 Libyan desert glass
 Lignite—brown coal 
 Limonite, a mixture of oxides and hydroxides of iron
 Moldavite
 Mookaite/Radiolarite
 Obsidian—volcanic glass; non-crystalline structure, a silica rich glass 
 Opal, non-crystalline hydrated silica silicon dioxide, solid (IMA/CNMNC valid mineral name)
 Ozokerite, a black waxy hydrocarbon mixture
 Palagonite 
 Pearl, organically produced carbonate
 Pele's hair
 Petroleum, liquid, organic 
 Psilomelane
 Pumice
 Pyrobitumen, amorphous fossilized petroleum (noncrystalline, organic)
 Shungite, black, lustrous, more than 98 weight percent of carbon
 Sideromelane, volcanic glass – non-crystalline, an iron rich, silica poor glass 
 Tektite, meteoritic silica rich glass
 Water, e.g. as inclusions in other crystals, or in the form of rain, liquid
 Zietrisikite, a mineral hydrocarbon wax

See also
List of minerals – Mineraloids are listed after minerals in each alphabetically sorted section.

References

External links
 The Mineraloids Class. Amethyst Galleries.

Mineralogy

de:Mineraloid
he:מינרל#מינרלואידים